Ali Bahadur  (1758–1802), also known as  Krishna Sinh, was a Nawab of the dominion of Banda (present day Uttar Pradesh) in northern India, a vassal of the Maratha Empire. He was the son of Shamsher Bahadur I and the grandson of Peshwa Bajirao I.

Under the auspices of the powerful Maratha nobles, Ali Bahadur established his authority over large parts of Bundelkhand and became the Peshwa's Subedar of Banda. His son and successor Shamsher Bahadur II held allegiance towards the Maratha polity and fought the English in the Anglo-Maratha War of 1803.

See also
Maratha Empire
Mahadaji Shinde, Maharaja of Gwalior
Shamsher Bahadur I
Bhat Peshwa Family

References

Further reading 
 Ranjit Desai. Swami , a historical novel

Indian Hindus
Peshwa dynasty
People of the Maratha Empire
Marathi people
18th-century Indian monarchs
1758 births
1802 deaths